Greece competed at the 2002 Winter Paralympics in Salt Lake City, United States. 1 competitor from Greece won no medals and so did not place in the medal table.

See also 
 Greece at the Paralympics
 Greece at the 2002 Winter Olympics

References 

2002
2002 in Greek sport
Nations at the 2002 Winter Paralympics